Bhonyara is a village in Vinchhiya Taluka of Rajkot district, Gujarat, India.

History
During British period, it was under Jasdan State. It derives its name from a cave in the neighbouring hill, where there is also a fort. This is the fort destroyed by Chudasama king Khengara in 12th century, according to bardic tale.

Demography
The population of Bhoira according to the census of 1872 was 584 and according to that of 1881, 526 souls.

References 

 This article incorporates text from a publication now in the public domain: 

Villages in Rajkot district